Independent Division of Zhejiang Provincial Military District(1st Formation) was formed in December 1964 from the assets of 82nd Garrison Regiment of the inactivating 16th Garrison Division and 92nd Garrison Regiment. 

The division was composed of 3 infantry regiments(1st to 3rd) and a machine-gun artillery battalion.

In July 1966 the division was renamed as 1st Independent Division of Zhejiang Provincial Military District with 2nd Independent Division of Zhejiang Provincial Military District's formation.

From August 1967 to November 14th 1969 the division was put under command of 20th Army Corps. After that the division was returned to Zhejiang Provincial Military District's control.

On March 25th 1975, the division exchanged its designation and position with 1st Independent Division of Anhui Provincial Military District and became the second formation of 1st Independent Division of Anhui Provincial Military District().

On May 26th 1976 the division was renamed as Independent Division of Anhui Provincial Military District() following 2nd Independent Division of Anhui Provincial Military District's disbandment. The artillery Regiment of the disbanding 73rd Army Division was attached to the division.

In December 1980 the division was disbanded.

References

中国各省军区独立师的历史沿革, https://web.archive.org/web/20160918225002/http://www.360doc.com/content/13/1205/20/1164894_334784330.shtml

Independent Anhui
Military units and formations disestablished in 1980
Military units and formations established in 1964